This is a list of the 24 members of the European Parliament for Belgium in the 1989 to 1994 session.

List

Notes

1989
List
Belgium